Coleophora taygeti is a moth of the family Coleophoridae. It is found in Spain, France, Italy, Greece and Romania.

References

taygeti
Moths of Europe
Moths described in 1983